Government Post Graduate College Bannu is Government sector college located in Bannu town of Khyber Pakhtunkhwa in Pakistan. The college offers programs for intermediate level both in Arts and Science groups for which it is affiliated with Board of Intermediate and Secondary Education Bannu. The college also offers 2-year BA & BSc programs plus 4 years BS programs in various disciplines for which it is affiliated with University of Science and Technology Bannu.

Overview and history 
Government Post Graduate College Bannu started as Intermediate college in 1951. Initially it started classes only in Social Sciences (Arts). Science classes were started in 1954. In 1955, the college started degree level Social Sciences classes while in 1967, it started degree courses in Science.

In 1973, Postgraduate level degree classes were started in English, Botany, Chemistry and Economics. Political Science and Mathematics classes were started in 1980.

BS 4-Years degree programs were started in 2010–2011 in the subjects of Zoology, Physics, computer Science, Electronics, Economics, Political Science, Chemistry, Health and Physical Education, English, Botany, Mathematics and Pakistan Studies.

Departments and faculties 
The college has the following departments and faculties.

Faculty of Physical Sciences
 Department of Chemistry
 Department of Computer Science
 Department of Electronics
 Department of Mathematics
 Department of Statistics
 Department of Physics

Faculty of Biological Sciences
 Department of Botany
 Department of Zoology

Faculty of Social Sciences
 Department of Economics
 Department of English
 Department of Health and Physical Education
 Department of Islamiyat/Arabic
 Department of Pak Studies
 Department of Pashto
 Department of Political Science
 Department of Urdu

Academic programs 
The college currently offers the following programs.

Intermediate
 FSc – Pre-Medical (2 years)
 FSc – Pre-Engineering (2 years)
 FSc – Computer Science (2 years)
 FA – General Science (2 years)
 FA – Humanities (2 years)

Post graduate MA/MSc(2 years)
 MA English 
 MSc Botany
 MSc Chemistry 
 MA Economics
 MA Political Science
 MSc Mathematics

BS Degrees (4 years)
 BS Zoology 
 BS Physics
 BS Computer Science 
 BS Electronics
 BS Economics 
 BS Political Science
 BS Chemistry
 BS Health and Physical Education
 BS English
 BS Botany
 BS Mathematics
 BS Pakistan Studies

See also  
 University of Science And Technology Bannu
 Khushal Khan Khattak University
 Government Post Graduate College Karak
 Government Post Graduate College Lakki Marwat

External links 
 Government Post Graduate College Bannu Official Website

References 

Public universities and colleges in Khyber Pakhtunkhwa
Bannu District